La Introducción is the debut album of Bachata duo Carlos & Alejandra. It was released in 2009 by Machete Music and Universal Music Latin Entertainment. The album was nominated for Tropical Album of the Year at the 2009 Premios Lo Nuestro 2010 Awards. In 2010 the duo released an extended edition titled La Introducción...Continued. This version featured 3 additional songs.

Track listing

References

2009 debut albums
Machete Music albums